Joseph Spallina Roman (May 23, 1923 – February 6, 2018) was an American actor and gym instructor. He was best known for playing Sgt. Brill on 147 episodes of the American medical drama television series Quincy, M.E. from 1976 to 1983.

Roman was born in Philadelphia, Pennsylvania. At the age of 15 he was a gym instructor for YMCA Philadelphia, and by two years later owned his own gym. Roman appeared in four films with longtime pal and actor, Charles Bronson. He also performed in two Broadway plays, Twilight Walk and Infidel Caesar. Roman died in February 2018, at the age of 94.

Filmography

Film

Television

References

External links 

Rotten Tomatoes profile

1923 births
2018 deaths
People from Philadelphia
Male actors from Pennsylvania
American male film actors
American male television actors
20th-century American male actors